Romano Perticone (born 13 August 1986) is an Italian professional footballer who plays as a defender for Cittadella.

Biography

Milan
In the 2004–05 season, he was awarded no.47 shirt of the Milan first team.

Livorno
After three seasons on loan, Perticone left for Livorno along with Marcus Diniz in co-ownership deals for a total fee of €900,000. Which Perticone's half was valued for €600,000. In June 2009 Livorno acquired Perticone outright for €2.5 million, but also sold Diniz back to Milan for €2.5 million.

Novara
In summer 2012 Perticone was signed by Novara Calcio for €900,000 in a four-year contract, with Giuseppe Gemiti moved to Livorno also for €900,000. In summer 2014 Perticone was signed by Empoli F.C., with Luca Martinelli moved to opposite direction also on loan.

Trapani
On 22 January 2015, he left for Trapani in a temporary deal. On 21 June 2015, Trapani excised the option to sign him outright from Novara.

Salernitana
On 25 July 2018, he signed a two-year contract with an option for the third year with Serie B club Salernitana.

Cittadella
On 2 September 2019, he signed with Cittadella.

References

External links
National Team stats. at FIGC 

Living people
1986 births
People from Melzo
Footballers from Lombardy
Association football midfielders
Italian footballers
Association football defenders
A.C. Milan players
A.S. Pizzighettone players
Hellas Verona F.C. players
U.S. Cremonese players
U.S. Livorno 1915 players
U.C. Sampdoria players
Modena F.C. players
Novara F.C. players
Trapani Calcio players
A.C. Cesena players
U.S. Salernitana 1919 players
A.S. Cittadella players
Serie A players
Serie B players
Serie C players
Sportspeople from the Metropolitan City of Milan